Young Men's Preparatory Academy is a public, single-gender preparatory school located in Miami, Florida, United States. It is a part of Miami-Dade County Public Schools (MDCPS), and serves grades 6-12. It also has an extensive leadership curriculum that revolves around The Seven Habits Of Highly Effective Teens. Young Men's Preparatory Academy also has AP courses for high school students, such as AP Computer Science and also is known for their STEM education  and programs, including in: Mathematics, Science, and Technology.

Laura Isensee and Michael Vasquez of the Miami Herald described the goal of the school as "to hone boys into young men, ready for college." Initially the school only had high school grades, but because Young Women's Preparatory Academy was a 6-12 school, the YMPA administration later decided to expand the school. In 2012 the sixth grade was added, and middle school grades were subsequently included.

Operations
The school uniforms of Young Men's Preparatory Academy have and include: brown or black-colored shoes, khaki pants, light blue, logo dress shirt ( whether short sleeved or long sleeved), red, school logo tie, and a school logo blazer.

The school does not offer athletics.

MDCPS does not provide transportation to and from this school.

Academic performance
As of 2012, over 90% of its graduates had been accepted to colleges and universities.

Student body
As of 2012 there were over 140 students, an enrollment Isensee and Vasquez attributed to the lack of athletics and transportation and the difficulty of recruiting boys; they characterized the enrollment number as low in number.

Principal Edouard stated in 2019 that the boys at this school were more likely to take risks in regards to gaining dominance and not school-related positions *wink-wink* compared to boys at coeducational schools.

References

External links
 Young Men's Preparatory Academy

High schools in Miami
Schools in Miami
Public boys' schools in the United States
Middle schools in Florida
Public high schools in Florida
Boys' schools in the United States